“Marcha Roberto Sacasa” was the national anthem of Nicaragua adopted in 1889 after the assumption of presidency by Roberto Sacasa. It was composed by Alejandro Cousin and it had no words. It was abolished after the liberal revolution of 1893, when it was replaced by the new national anthem Hermosa Soberana.

Due to its peaceful character, political opponents of President Roberto Sacasa (nicknamed “El Palomo”) called this anthem by the nickname “El Himno de los Palomos” (The Anthem of the Doves).

References

External links
 

National anthems
Historical national anthems
National symbols of Nicaragua
Nicaraguan songs
North American anthems
National anthem compositions in C major